The Yamaha EX5 is a synthesizer/workstation produced by Yamaha from 1998 to 2000. The EX5 combines several methods of sound generation (see below). The later released EX7 was a cheaper version of the EX5 with fewer keys, polyphony, sounds and functions. The Yamaha EX music synthesizers, along with the early Yamaha S series, were the predecessors of the Motif workstation series.

Features
The Yamaha EX5 (EX stands for Extended Synthesis) uses four different tone generators for generating sounds. These are AWM2 (Advanced Wave Memory), AN (Analog Physical Modeling), FDSP (Formulated Digital Sound Processing) and VL (Virtual Acoustic) synthesis. The fifth sound source is Sample-based synthesis. Sounds can be assembled up to a maximum of 4 tones, each from a different tone generator.

The EX5 has extensive sampling capabilities. Samples can be used in AWM sounds, or assigned to individual keys on the keyboard and saved to floppy disk or an external storage device. The sample memory is 1MB, and this can be expanded to 65MB with volatile SIMM memory. Non-volatile Flash Memory can be installed to allow samples to be retained between power cycles. Flash memory capacity can be either 8MB or 16MB.

EX5 has a built-in 16-track sequencer, and a 4-track arpeggiator with 50 preset patterns.

There was a limited edition released at the end of production, Yamaha EX5S (also known as the "Millennium Edition"). This model came in a silver casing and is only distributed for the Asian market. There were only 500 copies produced.

EX5R
The EX5 also came as a sound module on the market. This model was the EX5R and had all the functions of the EX5, except a keyboard.

See also
 Synthesizer
 Music workstation

References 

 Vintage Synth Explorer
 Sound On Sound, May 1998
 Website Yamaha USA

External links
 

EX5
Digital synthesizers
Virtual analog synthesizers
Samplers (musical instrument)
Music workstations